Mark Gillespie, (born 17 November 1970 in Stockport, England) is a singer, songwriter, currently living and touring in Germany, where he has built himself a substantial fanbase, and has toured with Jethro Tull, Meat Loaf, Lisa Stansfield, Fool's Garden and Chris De Burgh.

History

Mark Gillespie and his friend Jonathan Mansfield went to Mile End school in Stockport where, as Gillespie contends on the "Supersonic Wednesday" DVD, they were "the only ones being heterosexual". Teachers told them it would be helpful to gain life experience if they wanted to become successful actors. To do so, they hitch-hiked across Europe, which they financed by busking.

They named their newly formed band "The Blue Jars" and toured through countries like Belgium, Germany, Norway, Sweden or finally Israel, where Mansfield stayed. After Gillespie returned from Israel, he mainly toured in Germany. While busking in the Lower Saxonian town Göttingen, Gillespie caught the attention of Peter Herrmann, owner of a recording studio in Gießen. Being quite impressed by him, he offered Gillespie to record a CD that he could sell in the pedestrian zones while busking.

Gillespie, being in a studio for the first time ever, sang his songs with musicians he had never met (Peter Herrmann had organised them), which resulted in his 1996 debut album, "Give it Time." After the CD was done, it was sold very well and people asked for a concert with the band. A CD release concert followed, with Mark Gillespie as singer and guitarist, Peter Herrmann as bassist, Markus Leukel as drummer and Thomas Dill as lead guitarist.

The audience and the band were enthusiastic, which galvanised the band into playing another concert and finally forming a band, the Mark Gillespie Band.

The Mark Gillespie Band
The band line-up remained unchanged for about a decade and yielded several live and studio albums. In 1997, they released their follow-up to the debut, "Live at the Traumstern '97." Another live recording, "Exit", came in 1998, featuring acoustic performances of original and cover songs by Herrmann and Gillespie.

In 1999, 2000, and 2002, the band released three studio albums: "Mindless People," "I believe...," and "Barefoot and Naked," respectively. On 9 June 2004, the band returned to the "Traumstern" venue in Lich to record a live gig, later released on the CD/DVD set, "Supersonic Wednesday." The CD and DVD were available separately and slightly varied in editing and track listing.

In 2006, Gillespie ran a promotional campaign for his newsletter subscribers, releasing exclusive unreleased live recordings, videos, remixes, guest appearances and demos in regular intervals. At first, these were available for download as MP3 files, but due to legal complications, Gillespie had to switch to streaming some way into the campaign.

"Unplugged," a set of studio-recorded acoustic versions of original Gillespie songs and covers, was released in 2007, including several new songs.

Over the years, guest musicians had occasionally joined the band as well, e.g. José Cortijo ("Percussion and all kinds of strange things"), Miriam Pfaff and Tess Wiley (Backing Vocals) on the 2004 DVD, "Supersonic Wednesday."

Since 2008

The band has been in a state of flux since 2008. By 2008, the members of the Band were Gillespie, Herrmann, Leukel, Oliver Jäger (Keyboards), Gerd Stein (electric guitar), who replaced Dill (Dill left the band in February 2008), and Thomas Drost (flute), whom Mark got to know during a street music festival. Leukel parted ways with the band some time later as well.

Mark Gillespie subsequently mostly performed on his own or in "Duo" gigs with Thomas Drost on the flute. Interspersed were occasional band performances.

2009 saw the release of the Mark Gillespie Band album, "In Your Hands," comprising songs written and recorded over the period of several years and featuring the classic pre-2008 line-up. It was the first studio album not to feature an instrumental song.

In 2012, Gillespie released "Real to Reel," a live album pulled from performances with Thomas Drost. The album featured classic Gillespie material as well as cover versions of songs by Sting, Eric Clapton, The Beatles, Snow Patrol. It also featured two new songs, "Throw me a Line" and "The Friends you have Gained."

During 2013, Gillespie announced the band were planning to record a new album in the fall.

Kings Of Floyd
In 2011, Mark Gillespie co-founded the Pink Floyd tribute band "Kings Of Floyd", which he has been performing with since, in addition to his continued solo, duo and band performances.The spectrum ranges from albums like Meddle, The Dark Side of the Moon, Wish You Were Here, Animals, The Wall, to more recent works. The new High Hopes Tour was supposed to start in January 2022, but to be postponed to late summer 2022 due to the COVID-19 pandemic.

Band members
 Mark Gillespie – guitars, vocals
 Maurus Fischer – guitars
 Jürgen Magdziak – keyboards, vocals 
 Berni Bovens – drums
 Frank Höfliger – bass, vocals 
 Bernd Winterschladen – saxophones
Past members
 Lucy Wende/Lucy Fischer – backing vocals
 Andy Schmidgen – keyboards, vocals 
 Hans Maahn – bass
 Ian Stewart – bass
 Bernd Renn († 2015) – bass
 Reto Mandelkow – saxophones

Style, Personality

Gillespie's musical style is largely acoustic and soft rock, but comprises influences from Jazz, Progressive Rock and various other genres. Fans of the band especially appreciate Gillespie's humor, spontaneity and talent for improvisation.

Gillespie lives near Aachen and is known for his disfavour of German police and bureaucracy limiting independent artists' liberties to perform and express themselves.

Discography

Albums
1996: Give it Time
1999: Mindless People
2000: I believe...
2002: Barefoot and Naked
2007: Unplugged
2009: In Your Hands

Live albums
1997: Live at the Traumstern '97
1998: Exit (live)
2004: Supersonic Wednesday (live)
2012: Real to Reel

DVDs
2004: Supersonic Wednesday (live)

Citations

References
 DVD: "Supersonic Wednesday Live" by Mark Gillespie Band, Documentary
 Mark Gillespie Band Website
 Newsletter of the Mark Gillespie Band

1970 births
Living people
English male singers
English songwriters
People from Stockport
Musicians from Greater Manchester
21st-century English singers
21st-century British male singers
British male songwriters